Olga Sanko (born 28 February 1978) is a retired Russian handball player. She last played for Hypo Niederösterreich in Austria, from 2009 to 2019.

Referencer 

1978 births
Living people
Russian female handball players